
The following is a list of museums in Hong Kong.

(LCSD) indicates a museum managed by the Leisure and Cultural Services Department
(EPD) indicates a museum managed by the Environmental Protection Department
* indicates government-run museums

See also

 Tourism in Hong Kong
 History of Hong Kong
 Culture of Hong Kong
 List of buildings and structures in Hong Kong

External links

 Hong Kong Immigration Museum (archive)
 Hobby and Toy Museum (archive)
 Sun Museum
 Tao Heung Museum of Food Culture (archive)
 Art Museum The Chinese University of Hong Kong
 Hong Kong Trams Station
Hong Kong Jockey Club Drug InfoCentre

 
Museums
Hong Kong
Museums
Hong Kong
Hong Kong